is a railway station in the town of Nasu, Tochigi Prefecture, Japan, operated by the East Japan Railway Company (JR East).

Lines
Takaku Station is served by the Tōhoku Main Line, and is located 167.3 rail kilometers from the official starting point of the line at Tokyo Station.

Station layout
Takaku Station has two opposed side platforms connected to the station building by a footbridge. The station is unattended.

Platforms

History
Takaku Station opened on September 1, 1964. The station was absorbed into the JR East network upon the privatization of the Japanese National Railways (JNR) on April 1, 1987.

Surrounding area
 Nasukogen Hospital

External links

 JR East Station information 

Railway stations in Tochigi Prefecture
Tōhoku Main Line
Railway stations in Japan opened in 1887
Stations of East Japan Railway Company
Nasu, Tochigi